45th Division may refer to:

Infantry divisions
 45th Reserve Division (German Empire) 
 45th Landwehr Division (German Empire)
 45th Infantry Division (Wehrmacht)
 45th Rifle Division (Soviet Union)
 45th Infantry Division (United Kingdom) 
 45th Infantry Division (United States) 
 45th Infantry Division (Poland) 
 45th Division (Spain)

Aviation divisions
 45th Air Division (United States)